Sienna  is a village in the administrative district of Gmina Lipowa, within Żywiec County, Silesian Voivodeship, in southern Poland.

The village was established in 1608 by Mikołaj Komorowski, the owner of Żywiec Latifundium. It has a population of 952.

References

Sienna